Kirsten Flipkens and Johanna Larsson were the defending champions, but Flipkens chose not to participate this year.

Larsson played alongside Kiki Bertens and successfully defended the title, defeating Luksika Kumkhum and Peangtarn Plipuech in the final, 6–4, 6–1.

Seeds

Draw

References
Main Draw

Korea Open - Doubles
2017 Korea Open
Korea Open (tennis)